Lars Helminen (born January 1, 1985) is an American former professional ice hockey player who played in the ECHL, SM-Liiga, and Austrian Hockey League. His brother, Dwight, played parts of two seasons in the National Hockey League.

Playing career
Lars played for the Compuware Ambassadors in the NAHL during the 2002-03 season. He went on from there to play four years at Michigan Tech. After  his senior year, he went straight to the Idaho Steelheads of the ECHL for the end of the 2006–07 season.

Lars spent the 2007-08 season in Finland, playing for JYP in the SM-liiga, along with his brother Dwight. Lars then moved to the EBEL playing with Linz EHC.

Career statistics

Awards and honors

References

External links

1985 births
Ice hockey players from Michigan
Idaho Steelheads (ECHL) players
Living people
People from Brighton, Michigan
American people of Finnish descent
Michigan Tech Huskies men's ice hockey players
American men's ice hockey defensemen
Sportspeople from Metro Detroit